Woolundunga may refer to.

Woolundunga, South Australia, a locality
Woolundunga Station, a pastoral property in South Australia
District Council of Woolundunga, a former local government area in South Australia
Hundred of Woolundunga, a cadastral unit